"Why Don't You" is a 2010 single by Serbian DJ Gramophonedzie. It was released on 28 February 2010 as a download and on 1 March 2010 in CD format. It samples Peggy Lee's 1947 version of the 1936 song "Why Don't You Do Right?". The single was certified gold in Italy.

Critical reception
Fraser McAlpine of BBC Chart Blog gave the song a mixed review stating:

I'm detecting a theme here. After the burlesque boom and all the Winehouse wannabes – and Wiley's reworking of that song by White Town that samples that other song from the olden days – here comes dance music's tribute to the era of jazz, swing and blues. And when I say tribute, I mean taking an old tune and hitting it with a massive mallet until it cracks into a million pieces, then putting the bits back together with micro-robots and spraying it gold.

That is simply how dance music likes to pay tribute to things. Can you imagine how messy Fat Boy Slim's funeral is going to be? Loads messy, that's how.

The song was awarded 3 stars.

Track listings
CD single
"Why Don't You" (Radio Edit) – 2:50
"Why Don't You" (Bingo Players Mix) – 6:13

Digital download
"Why Don't You" (Radio Edit) – 2:50
"Why Don't You" (Trevor Loveys Remix) – 5:35
"Why Don't You" (DJ Sneak Remix) – 6:45
"Why Don't You" (GreenMoney's GramoPhountzied Remix) – 4:44
"Why Don't You" (GreenMoney's GramoPhountzied Dub) – 4:50

Charts

Weekly charts

Year-end charts

Release history

References

External links
 

2010 singles
2010 songs
Number-one singles in Israel
Positiva Records singles
Virgin Records singles
Electro swing songs